Marma is a Gaupalika in Darchula District in the Sudurpashchim Province of far-western Nepal. Marma has a population of 14956.The land area is 208.06 km2.

References

Rural municipalities in Darchula District
Rural municipalities of Nepal established in 2017